Trương Mỹ Hoa (born 8 May 1945) is a Vietnamese politician from Tiền Giang Province and a member of Communist Party of Vietnam since 1963. She was vice president from 2002 to 2007 after holding various party and government positions in Hanoi and Ho Chi Minh City and being involved in the Vietnam War.

Trương Mỹ Hoa was party secretary and People's Committee chairman of Tân Bình district of Ho Chi Minh City from 1986 to 1991 before continuing her career at the centre.
She has held positions as a member of Executive Board the Central Party Committee, a member of Congress Party delegation, vice chairman of Vietnam National Assembly from 1994 to 2002, as well as the vice president from 2002 to 2007.

Trương Mỹ Hoa is married since late 1975 and has two daughters.

References

References
 Gainsborough, Martin (2010): Vietnam - Rethinking the State. Zed Books: London & New York

1945 births
Living people
20th-century Vietnamese women politicians
20th-century Vietnamese politicians
Members of the 7th Secretariat of the Communist Party of Vietnam
Alternates of the 6th Central Committee of the Communist Party of Vietnam
Members of the 6th Central Committee of the Communist Party of Vietnam
Members of the 7th Central Committee of the Communist Party of Vietnam
Members of the 8th Central Committee of the Communist Party of Vietnam
Members of the 9th Central Committee of the Communist Party of Vietnam
People from Tiền Giang province
Vice presidents of Vietnam
Women vice presidents
21st-century Vietnamese women politicians
21st-century Vietnamese politicians